is a Japanese singer, actor, tarento, and model as well as member of Hey! Say! JUMP. He is under the management of Johnny & Associates.

Career
On June 2, 2003, he joined Johnny & Associates as a trainee. As a Johnny's Jr., he was a member of J.J.Express. However, before he became a part of Johnny & Associates, he was a member of Junes Project.

When he was 14 in 2005, he played Toru Sonobe in the drama Engine with his Johnny's senior Takuya Kimura of SMAP.

On April 3, 2007, he joined the temporary group Hey! Say! 7, with soon to be fellow members of Hey! Say! JUMP, Yuya Takaki, Ryosuke Yamada, Yuto Nakajima and Yuri Chinen, starting with a public performance at KAT-TUN's 2007 Cartoon KAT-TUN II You concert.

On September 21, 2007, he began performing as a member of Hey! Say! JUMP.

In October 2008, he acted in the drama Sensei wa Erai! as Rin Takekura, along with other Hey! Say! JUMP members; Ryosuke Yamada, Yuto Nakajima and Yuri Chinen.

In the same year, he was in the drama called Scrap Teacher: Kyoushi Saisei, as Sugizō Irie. With the Hey! Say! JUMP members that played alongside him in Sensei wa Erai!.

Discography

Songs
 "Kimi to Boku no Future"
 "Time" (Lyrics by Yuya Takaki; Arranged by Daiki)
 "RELOAD" (Lyrics by Daiki)
 "Sakura Saita yo" (Rap Lyrics by Daiki)
 "UNION" (Lyrics by Kota Yabu, Hikaru Yaotome and Daiki)

Concerts
For Hey! Say! JUMP or Hey! Say! BEST-related concerts, please see Hey! Say! JUMP.

Filmography

Self
Itadaki High JUMP

Movies 
 Jam Films 2: Fastener (2004)
 Innocent Curse (2017) as Ezaki Shunya
 Code Blue the Movie (2018) as Souma Natori
 Shin Ultraman (2022) as Akihisa Taki

Drama
 Hyakujuu Sentai Gaoranger (TV Asahi, 2001) as Futaro
 Saigo no Bengonin (NTV, 2003, ep2)
 Engine (TV series) (Fuji TV, 2005) as Tōru Sonobe
 Sensei wa Erai! (NTV, 2008) as Rin Takekura
 Scrap Teacher (NTV, 2008) as Sugizō Irie
 Chūshingura Sono Gi Sono Ai (TV Tokyo, 2012) as Ōishi Chikara
 Kindaichi Shounen no Jikenbo: Hong Kong Kowloon Zaiho Satsujin Jiken (NTV, 2013) as Ryūji Saki
 Kindaichi Shounen no Jikenbo: Gokumon Juku Satsujin Jiken (NTV, 2014) as Ryūji Saki
 Kindaichi Shounen no Jikenbo Neo (NTV, 2014) as Ryūji Saki
 Okitegami Kyōko no Bibōroku (NTV, 2015) as Nuru Narikawa
 Code Blue 3 (Fuji TV, 2017) as Natori Souma
 Koshoku Robot (NTV, 2017) as Mujaki

Awards

References

External links
 Hey! Say! JUMP
 Johnny's-net

1991 births
Living people
Johnny & Associates
Japanese idols
Japanese male pop singers
Hey! Say! JUMP members
21st-century Japanese male actors
Musicians from Chiba Prefecture
Actors from Chiba Prefecture
21st-century Japanese singers
21st-century Japanese male singers